El DeBarge is the debut album by El DeBarge.  It was released in 1986 on Gordy Records (a sub-label of Motown) and featured the three hit singles, "Who's Johnny," which peaked at #3 on the Billboard Hot 100, "Love Always," which reached #43, and "Someone," which was a Top 20 Billboard A/C hit and made it to #70 on the Hot 100. Singer/actress Vanity featured on backing vocals on the track, "Secrets Of The Night". This album was certified by RIAA as gold in September, 1986, selling over 500,000 copies.

Track listing
"Who's Johnny" (Peter Wolf, Ina Wolf) – 4:11
"Secrets Of The Night" (Albert Hammond, Diane Warren) – 4:20
"I Wanna Hear It From My Heart" (Warren) – 4:25
"Someone" (Jay Graydon, Mark Mueller, Robbie Nevil) – 4:45
"When Love Has Gone Away" (Jack Conrad, Larry Henley) – 3:08
"Private Line" (Diane Warren) – 3:48
"Love Always" (Burt Bacharach, Bruce Roberts, Carole Bayer-Sager) – 5:32
"Lost Without Her Love" (Randy Goodrum, Graydon) – 4:35
"Thrill Of The Chase" (Alan Roy Scott, Roy Freeland, Gary Pickus) – 3:47
"Don't Say It's Over" (Diane Warren) – 4:32

Reception

Jason Elias of AllMusic stated: "While the setup and idea are still exciting on paper, [the album] is a disappointment." He also stated that "the majority of the [...] tracks just don't do anything to enliven the product or accentuate his voice," and concluded by writing that "the fact that DeBarge didn't have a hand in producing or writing the songs all but made this ho-hum from the start."

Personnel 
 El DeBarge – lead vocals (all tracks), backing vocals (1, 3, 5–8, 10)
 Peter Wolf – various instruments (1, 3, 10), arrangements (1, 3, 10)
 Robbie Buchanan – keyboards (2), arrangements (2, 6), select instruments (6, 9), Fender Rhodes (7), Yamaha DX7 (7)
 Laythan Armor – additional synthesizer programming (2)
 David Boruff – additional synthesizer programming (2), saxophone (2, 6)
 Jay Graydon – all instruments (4), arrangements (4, 5, 8, 9), select instruments [synthesizers, guitar] (5, 8, 9)
 David Foster – select instruments (5), additional synthesizer (7)
 Randy Goodrum – select instruments (5, 8)
 Burt Bacharach – additional synthesizer (7), arrangements (7)
 Michael Boddicker – select instruments (9)
 Dann Huff – guitar (1–3, 6, 7, 10)
 Marty Walsh – guitar (7)
 Neil Stubenhaus – bass (7)
 Mike Baird – select instruments [presumably drums] (5, 9)
 John Robinson – drums (7)
 Paulinho da Costa – percussion (7)
 Ernie Watts – alto sax solo (10)
 Robbie Nevil – arrangements (4)
 Carole Bayer Sager – arrangements (7)
 Siedah Garrett – backing vocals (1, 3, 10)
 Phillip Ingram – backing vocals (1, 3, 10)
 Dennis Lambert – backing vocals (1, 3, 10)
 Michael McDonald – backing vocals (1, 3, 10)
 Phil Perry – backing vocals (1, 3, 10)
 Julia Waters – backing vocals (1, 3, 10)
 Oren Waters – backing vocals (1, 3, 10)
 Ina Wolf – backing vocals (1, 3, 10)
 Vanity – backing vocals (2)
 Tommy Funderburk – backing vocals (6)
 Jim Gilstrap – backing vocals (6)
 Bunny Hull – backing vocals (6)
 Tom Kelly – backing vocals (6)
 Richard Page – backing vocals (8)

Production 
 Peter Wolf – producer (1, 3, 10)
 Robbie Buchanan – producer (2, 6)
 Jay Graydon – producer (4, 5, 8, 9), recording (4, 5, 8, 9)
 Burt Bacharach – producer (7)
 Carole Bayer Sager – producer (7)
 Toby Jones – executive producer 
 Brian Malouf – recording (1, 3, 10), mixing (1, 3, 10)
 Barney Perkins – recording (2, 6), remixing (2, 6)
 Ian Eales – recording (4, 5, 8, 9)
 Dennis Mackay – mixing (4, 5, 8, 9), additional engineer (6)
 Michael Bowman – assistant engineer (1, 3, 10)
 Dan Garcia – assistant engineer (1, 3, 10)
 Stephen Krause – assistant engineer (1, 3, 10)
 Glen Holquin – assistant engineer (2)
 Craig Miller – assistant engineer (2)
 Mike Ross – additional engineer (6)
 Gail Pierson – album coordinator 
 Johnny Lee – art direction 
 Janet Levinson – design 
 Greg Gorman – photography

Studios
 Recorded at Garden Rake Studio (Sherman Oaks, CA); Image Recording Studios, Studio 55 and Lion Share Recording Studio (Los Angeles, CA); Bill Schnee Studios (North Hollywood, CA); Conway Studios (Hollywood, CA).
 Mixed at Can-Am Recorders (Tarzana, CA); Conway Studios, Studio 55 and Lion Share Recording Studio.
 Tracks 2 & 6 remixed at Yamaha International Recording (Glendale, CA).

Charts

Weekly charts

Year-end charts

Certifications

References

1986 debut albums
El DeBarge albums
Albums produced by Peter Wolf
Gordy Records albums